The tricolored big-eared bat (Glyphonycteris sylvestris) is a bat species from South and Central America.

Description
The fur on its back is long, woolly, and dark brown. Individual hairs are tricolored, with a dark basal band, lighter middle band, and dark distal band.

Biology and ecology
It is likely insectivorous and frugivorous. It is nocturnal, roosting in sheltered places during the day such as hollow trees and caves. These roosts consist of a colonies of up to 75 individuals.

Range and habitat
It is found in Bolivia, Brazil, Colombia, Costa Rica, French Guiana, Guyana, Honduras, Mexico, Nicaragua, Panama, Peru, Suriname, Trinidad and Tobago, and Venezuela.

As of 2018, it is considered a least-concern species by the IUCN.

References

Bats of South America
Bats of Brazil
Mammals of Colombia
Glyphonycteris
Mammals described in 1896
Taxa named by Oldfield Thomas
Bats of Central America